Yohannes Christian "Chris" John (born 14 September 1979) is an Indonesian former professional boxer who competed from 1998 to 2013. He held the WBA (Super) featherweight title from 2004 to 2013, with his near decade-long reign being the second longest in the division's history (after Johnny Kilbane). During his reign, John defended the title against 16 boxers, the second most in featherweight history (after Eusebio Pedroza).
 
Chris "The Dragon" John is the fourth Indonesian boxer to win a world title, following Ellyas Pical, Nico Thomas and Muhammad Rachman. In 2013, John announced his retirement from boxing, following his only career defeat to Simpiwe Vetyeka.

Early life
Chris John was born as Yohannes Christian John in Banjarnegara, on 14 September 1979. He is the second son of four siblings of Johan Tjahjadi (real name: Tjia Foek Sem) who is of Chinese descent and Maria Warsini. Boxing has been a part of John's life since his childhood. John's father was a former amateur boxer in Indonesia. He introduced boxing to his sons, John and his younger brother Adrian, at an early age of 5. John's Father inspired him by regaling with stories of hard fought battles and triumphant victories. Given the choice to fight or pursue other sports, John chose boxing and became an amateur champion in Banjarnegara.

In 1997, Chris caught the attention of renowned boxing trainer, Sutan Rambing. Sutan recruited John into his gym and relocated John to Semarang, a city in Central Java. Sutan served as John's trainer till 2004 and soon after parted ways when John won his first major world title.

Professional career

John turned professional in 1997 and was known as "Thin Man" before he proclaimed his new nickname "The Dragon" that he now uses. In his first professional fight, John won by knockout, beating a local fighter Word Kanda. In his 6th bout, the reputation of Chris John rose when he knocked out the national featherweight Champion in a 12 rounds bout, Muhammad Afaridzi. John was knocked down twice in round one, but he managed to reverse the situation by knocking Alfaridzi in round 12.
According to Chris John, his nose was bleeding profusely resulting from a broken nose that occurred in the 1st round.

Following the win over Dae-Kyun Park, Chris captured the PABA Featherweight title from the. John was given the opportunity to fight hard-hitting  Oscar León of Colombia for the WBA featherweight title on 26 September 2003 in Bali. John was The Ring's #8-ranked featherweight in the world (and #10 pound-for-pound), while Oscar was the #5-ranked featherweight in the world and #5 pound-for-pound. This was Oscar's second title fight in his career. His first, losing to then WBA featherweight champion Derrick Gainer in a twelve-round split-decision.

While both fighters were in their mid 20s, Oscar had several physical advantages over John: an inch in height and 5 inches in reach. John won by split decision in a 12-round match to win the WBA Featherweight title.

John vs. Rojas
After defeating Osamu Sato in Tokyo, Japan, John was given the opportunity to fight Jose Rojas of Venezuela in Tenggarong, East Kalimantan. The fight result was concluded as a technical draw because accidental head clash in round 4. John was deeply cut, and Rojas was slightly cut. Rojas entered as the challenger after Derrick Gainer refused to sign contract with the promoter.

In 2005, John split with trainer Sutan Rambing prior to Derrick Gainer Fight. Preparing for this bout Chris joined Harry's Gym in Perth, Australia, where he is currently trained and managed by Craig Christian.

Five months after the fight with Oscar, Chris went on to defend his WBA title to former champion Derrick Gainer. Heading to the bout, Derrick was favourite to take the title he lost 2 years ago to Lineal Champion Juan Manuel Marquez. It was considered to be an important fight for both men.

Despite scoring a first round knockdown, Derrick Gainer's attempt to once again win a world featherweight title failed at the Britama Arena Sport Hall in Jakarta, Indonesia. John won the match decisively by 12 round unanimous decision(118-109, 118-111, and 118-110).

John vs. Márquez
In the year of 2006, quadruple champion Juan Manuel Márquez challenged Chris for his WBA featherweight championship. Coming into the bout, Marquez fought to a draw against Manny Pacquiao.

John won by Unanimous Decision over 12 rounds. Marquez and his team disputed the decision, although all three judges scored in favour of John.

In 2012, following Marquez's upset win over Pacquiao, Chris John called him out for a second bout to be staged in Singapore or Macau in a neutral ground. "I am a much better boxer than him (Marquez) and I have more speed and skill," said John. "I will fight Marquez at any weight because it is a big money fight," John, told the Straits Times. Australian promoter Angelo Hyder said he would propose a fight at lightweight, meaning the Mexican would have to shed weight and John would have to gain about four kilograms (nine pounds). The bout never came to fruition.

John vs. Enoki
Prior to this bout, both fighters were undefeated, John standing at 41-0 and Enoki at 27-0. This was Hiroyuki Enoki first shot at a world title. A lot of hype was built up coming into the fight due to the history of world war two as Indonesia was a colony of Japan.

This fight was staged in a sold out korakuen hall in Tokyo, Japan. John took control from the outset and won unanimously by scores of 118-110, 118-110 and 117-111. This marked John's 10th world title defense.

John vs. Juarez
Following Enoki Fight, Chris called out Perennial contender Rocky Juarez. In an interview with Secondsout, John said, "I want all boxing fans to be able to see me in the ring. I just want to fight the best fighters in the world and by going to the United States, I can fight the best. I watched Rocky Juarez’ last fight with Jorge Barrios. Juarez would be a good fight for me. I am ready for him and anyone else at featherweight or super featherweight.

On February 28, 2009, the title fight materialize with Rocky Juarez in Toyota Center in Houston, Texas, which served as the main undercard for Juan Manuel Márquez vs. Juan Díaz. This was the first time he had fought on American soil. The fight was a unanimous draw after 12 competitive rounds, with all three judges scoring it 114-114.

The fight was listed in Ring Magazines 20 Biggest Robberies in the last 20 years.

John vs. Juarez II
The long-awaited rematch between Chris John and Rocky Juarez was staged in the MGM Grand Garden Arena in Las Vegas, as part of the undercard to Floyd Mayweather Jr. vs. Juan Manuel Márquez. John entered as the # 1 featherweight in the world according to The Ring Magazine. Juarez, a 2.1-1 underdog, came in as the # 4 featherweight. The bout, originally scheduled for June 27, was delayed due to a blood issue with Chris John. John had been reportedly feeling ill and fainted in training following a three-round sparring session. Tests two weeks later, however, showed no irregularities.

The rematch, the fight was one sided with John retaining his WBA title via 119-109, 117-111, 114-113, 12 round unanimous decision.

John vs. Yordan
Fellow Indonesian and leading contender Daud Yordan was next in line to fight John. The event was held in Jakarta International Expo, Kemayoran Central Jakarta on 17 April 2011.

Chris John won a unanimous decision over his challenger by scores of 117-112, 116-112, and 116-112.

John vs. Kimura
John defended his title for the 16th time on May 5, 2012, by defeating Japanese Shoji Kimura by unanimous decision. This marked his first win in Singapore and first out of his five fights contract in Marina Bay Sands.

John vs. Piriyapinyo
Chonlatarn Piriyapinyo was the second undefeated fighter to challenge John's featherweight title. This served as his second bout in Marina Bay Sands.  Billed as the "Battle of the Undefeated'. Coming into the fight, the thai fighter was ranked 6th in the featherweight division.

Chris John successfully defended his WBA featherweight title for the 17th time on Friday in Singapore, as the Indonesian Pride beat Thailand's Chonlatarn Piriyapinyo on unanimous decision scores of 117-111, 119-109, and 119-109."

In the Post fight interview, Chris John called out fellow champions Daniel Ponce de León, Billy Dib and Orlando Salido from other associations for a unification bout for the featherweight belt.

John vs. Hosono
Satoshi Hosono, rated 7th by WBA in the featherweight division, became John's 6th challenger from Japan. Fighting on April 14, 2013 at the Indoor Tennis Stadium, Jakarta, Indonesia, John suffered severe bleeding from his temple and forehead due to the headbutt which happened in round 3 of 12. The fight was declared as a technical draw, and John retained his title.

John vs. Vetyeka
John lost the WBA Super World featherweight title to Simpiwe Vetyeka on December 6, 2013, when John retired on his stool after the sixth of twelve rounds. Vetyeka's IBO featherweight title was also on the line. It was John's first professional loss and brought his ten-year WBA title reign to an end. After this loss, John decided to retire from boxing. Announcing his retirement on RCTI (Indonesia) Live with Trainer Craig Christian and management team of Yonathan Periatna and Tony Tolj (Australia) and Angelo Hyder. Now he runs his personal business with his wife, becomes a TV commercial star, motivator, and sometimes appears on TV shows.

Trainers in boxing
1984–1997: Johan Tjahjadi (John's father)
1997–2004: Sutan Rambing
2005–2013: Craig Christian

Awards
John was named awarded the Fighter of the Decade for the 2000s by the WBA, in a ceremony which took place in Panama City on 29 February 2012. This award was previously held by Roy Jones Jr. for his achievements in the 1990s.

In addition to being a professional boxer, John is also a member of the national wushu team. His successful achievements as a wushu athlete include:
Bronze medalist, South East Asian Games in Kuala Lumpur, Malaysia, 2001
Gold medalist, South East Asian Games in Jakarta, Indonesia, 1997
Gold medalist, Indonesian multi events games (National Olympic), Jakarta, 1996
Gold medalist, Indonesian wushu championship

Professional boxing record

References

External links

1979 births
Living people
Sportspeople from Jakarta
World Boxing Association champions
World featherweight boxing champions
Indonesian male boxers
Indonesian people of Chinese descent
Competitors at the 1997 Southeast Asian Games
Competitors at the 2001 Southeast Asian Games
Southeast Asian Games medalists in wushu
Southeast Asian Games gold medalists for Indonesia
Southeast Asian Games bronze medalists for Indonesia